Marino Grimani (c.1489–1546) was an Italian Cardinal and papal legate. He was from an aristocratic Venetian family.

He was elected bishop of Ceneda in 1508, when he was under age. He was patriarch of Aquileia in 1517. 

He was created Cardinal in 1527. He was bishop of Concordia in 1533, bishop of Città Castello in 1534, bishop of Saint Pons de Tomières, briefly, in 1534. He was bishop of Frascati in 1541, bishop of Porto e Santa Rufina in 1543.

References

External links

Biography

1546 deaths
16th-century Italian cardinals
Patriarchs of Aquileia
16th-century Roman Catholic bishops in the Republic of Venice
Cardinal-bishops of Frascati
Cardinal-bishops of Porto
Diplomats of the Holy See
Bishops of Saint-Pons-de-Thomières
Marino
Year of birth uncertain
Clergy from Venice